Fireball is a Breakout clone video game developed by Arcadia (whose name changed to "Starpath" during development) for the Atari 2600. The game was released on cassette tape and required the Starpath Supercharger add-on to play.

Gameplay
The game is similar to breakout in that the player uses a ball (a fireball, hence the name) to break-up walls made of bricks by hitting the bricks with the ball, with the shape of the walls changing as the player progresses. The game differs from breakout, however, in that rather than just being a bat, the player is controls an animated juggler who can catch and throw the ball at the bricks. The game also differs from the traditional Breakout format in that six fireballs may be kept in the air at any one time, and the brick that are to be destroyed in each level are arranged in varying shapes/patterns. Five different modes of play are provided, including "Firetrap", "Knock-a-block",  "Marching Blocks", "Migrating Blocks", and "Cascade", and as many as six balls may be on-screen at any given time.

The game may be played in single-player mode, or in a two-player mode where each player takes turns.

Reception
The contemporary reception to the game was broadly positive. The British TV Gamer magazine described it as "very similar to other Breakout games" though they also noted that the game was "challenging and entertaining". The German TeleMatch magazine gave it a positive review, praising its gameplay and graphics, and criticising only its "monotone" sound. Vidiot magazine described it as "the best variation on the Breakout theme yet". The 1984 Software Encyclopedia was broadly positive about the game, giving it 7/10.

Later reviewers have been more positive about Fireball. In Classic Home Video Games, 1972-1984: A Complete Reference Guide, Brett Weiss described in in-game action as "fun, hectic, and more than a little challenging". Writing for Atari HQ, Iida Keita also gave the game a positive review, describing the game as "very derivative and familiar to most classic videogame enthusiasts" whilst also saying that "the design does provide for some challenging and exciting play".

Reviews
Games

References

1983 video games
Atari 2600 games
Atari 2600-only games
Breakout clones
Video games developed in the United States